Pentagonaster may refer to:
Kunzea, a genus of shrub
Pentagonaster (starfish), a genus of sea star